The 1970 British Hard Court Championships, also known by its sponsored name Rothmans Open Hard Court Championships of Great Britain, was a combined men's and women's  tennis tournament played on outdoor clay courts at the West Hants Tennis Club in Bournemouth in the United Kingdom. The men's events were part of the 1970 Pepsi-Cola Grand Prix circuit and categorized as Class 2. It was the 41st edition of the tournament and was held from 27 April to 2 May 1970. Mark Cox and Margaret Court won the singles titles. Cox won £2,000 first-prize money while Court, who successfully defended her 1969 title, received £1,000 for her singles win.

Finals

Men's singles
 Mark Cox defeated  Bob Hewitt 6–1, 6–2, 6–3

Women's singles
 Margaret Court defeated  Virginia Wade 6–2, 6–3

Men's doubles
 Tom Okker /  Tony Roche defeated  William Bowrey /  Owen Davidson 2–6, 6–4, 6–4, 6–4

Women's doubles
 Margaret Court /  Judy Tegart defeated  Rosie Casals /  Billie Jean King 6–2, 6–8, 7–5

Mixed doubles
 Billie Jean King /  Bob Hewitt defeated   Virginia Wade /  Bob Maud 6–2, 6–2

References

External links
 International Tennis Federation (ITF) tournament details

British Hard Court Championships
British Hard Court Championships
Clay court tennis tournaments
1970 in English tennis
British Hard Court Championships
British Hard Court Championships